Pascal Chang-Soï (born October 18, 1966 in Tahiti) is a French clergyman and bishop for the Roman Catholic Diocese of Taiohae. He was ordained as a priest on 4 February 2000, and as a bishop on 4 December 2010. In March 2013 he was appointed apostolic administrator of Papeete. He was appointed bishop of Taiohae in 2015.

See also
Catholic Church in Oceania

References

1966 births
Living people
French Polynesian Roman Catholic bishops
Roman Catholic bishops of Taiohae